Lahore cricket teams, representing the city of Lahore, competed in Pakistan's first-class cricket tournaments from 1958–59 to 2018–19. They have also competed in the national 50-over and Twenty-20 tournaments as the Lahore Lions.

Teams
From 1953-54, the inaugural season of the Quaid-e-Azam Trophy, until 1957-58, the state of Punjab was represented by the Punjab cricket team (as well as by Punjab A and Punjab B in 1957-58). In the 1958-59 season the Punjab cities Lahore, Rawalpindi, Bahawalpur and Multan fielded teams. Owing to Lahore's population and cricketing strength, beginning with the 1961-62 season the Lahore Regional Cricket Association has usually fielded more than one team in first-class tournaments. (Karachi has done the same since the late 1950s.) 

From 1958-59 to 2014-15 there were 18 Lahore first-class teams. In order of appearance they were:

Lahore
1958-59 to 2003-04, 30 matches in nine seasons; eight wins, nine losses, 13 draws.
The highest score was 203 (retired hurt) by Iftikhar Bukhari in 1960-61. The best bowling figures were 9 for 28 by Khalid Qureshi, also in 1960-61.

Lahore A
1961-62 to 1977-78, 30 matches in 10 seasons.

Lahore B
1961-62 to 1977-78, 32 matches in 10 seasons.

Lahore Whites
1963-64 to 2004-05, 37 matches in six seasons; eight wins, 12 losses, 17 draws.

Lahore Greens
1963-64 to 1973-74, 18 matches in six seasons; five wins, three losses, 10 draws. 

Lahore Reds
1964-65 to 1973-74, four matches in four seasons; three losses, one draw.

Lahore Blues
1969-70 to 2004-05, 39 matches in seven seasons; 14 wins, 11 losses, 14 draws.

Lahore C
1974-75 to 1975-76, two matches in two seasons; two losses.

Lahore City A
1978-79 to 1987-88, six matches in three seasons; three wins, one loss, two draws. 

Lahore City B
1978-79, one match; one loss.

Lahore City
1979-80 to 1999-2000, 166 matches in 19 seasons; 48 wins, 60 losses, 58 draws.

Lahore City Whites
1983-84 to 1986-87, 18 matches in four seasons; six wins, six losses, six draws. 

Lahore City Blues
1983-84 to 1986-87, 11 matches in four seasons; five wins, two losses, four draws.

Lahore City Greens
1983-84, three matches in one season; no wins, one loss, two draws.

Lahore Shalimar
2005-06 to 2013-14, 77 matches in nine seasons; 15 wins, 35 losses, 27 draws.

Lahore Ravi
2005-06 to 2013-14, 75 matches in nine seasons; 20 wins, 24 losses, 31 draws.

Lahore Lions
2014-15, 11 matches in one season; two wins, eight losses, one draw.

Lahore Eagles
2014-15, six matches in one season; no wins, four losses, two draws.

Lahore Qalandars

Debuted in 2016 Pakistan Super League.

Honours

Quaid-e-Azam Trophy
Lahore teams have won the Quaid-e-Azam Trophy on four occasions.
 1968–69 (Lahore)
 1993–94 (Lahore)
 1996–97 (Lahore)
 2000–01 (Lahore Blues)

Patron's Trophy
Lahore teams have won the Patron's Trophy once.
 1999–2000 (Lahore City Blues)

See also
 Lahore Regional Cricket Association
 Lahore Lions
 Lahore Eagles
 Lahore women's cricket team

References

External links
 Cricinfo
 List of Lahore cricket teams 

Pakistani first-class cricket teams
Cricket in Lahore